Magri is an Italian and Maltese surname. It may refer to:

Charlie Magri (1956), English boxer
Count Primo Magri (1849–1920), American entertainer
John Magri (1941), Maltese cyclist
Jonathan Magri Overend (1970), Maltese footballer
Kevin Magri (1995), Italian footballer
Lucio Magri (1932–2011), Italian journalist
Maher Magri (1986), Tunisian footballer
Manuel Magri (1851–1907), Maltese ethnographer
Mayara Magri, Brazilian ballet dancer 
Pierluigi Magri (1940), Italian footballer
Sam Magri (1994), footballer

See also
9541 Magri, asteroid
Claudio Magris, Italian scholar
Moti Magri, Indian city
 mAgri an abbreviation for Mobile agriculture

Italian-language surnames
Maltese-language surnames